Glory of the Seas was a clipper ship launched in 1869. She was the last merchant sailing vessel built by Donald McKay.

Her voyages

On her maiden voyage, Glory of the Seas sailed from New York in February 1870 under the command of Captain John Geit. She anchored at San Francisco on June 13 after a passage of 120 days. From there she sailed to Liverpool, England, under Captain William Chatfield. McKay then sold Glory to J. Henry Sears of Boston, who replaced Captain Chatfield with Josia Nickerson Knowles.

Details of her time between 1870 and 1885 are incomplete, but she "ran between New York and British ports and San Francisco almost exclusively" during those years. She did make a fast voyage from New York to San Francisco between October 13, 1873 and mid-January, 1874 (see the table and note). In 1875 she set the record of 35 days for a passage from San Francisco to Sydney, Australia. According to McKay, until 1885 under Captain McLaughlin Glory carried general cargo from New York to San Francisco and wheat from there to Britain, and was nearly wrecked in a storm when arriving in Britain in 1880. The Bruzelius timetable  (below) differs and does not mention the 1880 event. Both agree that she was laid up at San Francisco between December 1882 and February 1885.

After 1885, Glory of the Seas spent the rest of her long life on the Pacific coast, for a time sailing between San Francisco and Puget Sound and occasionally to Alaska. In March 1906 she was sold in San Francisco for conversion to a barge but was repaired after the April earthquake and "put under sail again".  Under new owners in 1911, she was again stripped of her masts and converted to a floating fish cannery and then to a floating cold storage plant. On May 13, 1923, she was beached near Seattle and burned to recover her iron and copper.

Glory of the Seas known voyages are tabulated below. Entries are from Bruzelius unless noted otherwise; disagreements or ambiguities are individually cited. City names are as they were at the time.

Artifacts
The figurehead of Glory of the Seas is a partially-clad female figure. It is pictured in a book, The Clipper Ships, which notes that it is in the collection of a private New York City club, India House. The builder's half-model, four prints or paintings, and several relics are held by the Mariners' Museum in Newport News, Virginia.

Notes

References

Further reading
(2nd edition (2000). Palo Alto, CA: Glencannon Press. ISBN 978-1889901183)

See also
List of clipper ships

Ships built in Boston
Ships designed by Donald McKay
Extreme clippers